Bangladesh participated in the 1978 Asian Games which were held in Bangkok, Thailand from December 9, 1978, to December 20, 1978.

Football

Group C

 Bangladesh did not advance in next stage.

Field hockey

Men

Group B

5th place match

 Bangladesh ranked 6th in the field hockey.

Volleyball

Men

Group B

 Bangladesh did not advance in next stage.

Classification 7th–12th

 Bangladesh ranked 11th in the Volleyball.

Wrestling

 Jalil Abdul competed in +100.0 weight class in 1978-12-11 and stood 5th.

See also
 Bangladesh at the Asian Games
 Bangladesh at the Olympics

References

Nations at the 1978 Asian Games
1978
Asian Games